Parc des Sports  is a multi-purpose stadium in Avignon, France. It is currently used mostly for football matches and hosts the home matches of AC Avignonnais. The capacity of the stadium is 17,518 spectators.

Rugby league
Since its opening in 1975, Parc des Sports has hosted fourteen France international rugby league matches with the first on 5 December 1982, when France hosted Australia as part of the 1982 Kangaroo tour. In front of 8,000 fans, Australia won the game 15–4 against a very committed French team (the 1982 Kangaroos were the first touring side to go through Great Britain and France undefeated earning them the nickname of "The Invincibles"). Its last international match was on Friday 1 November 2013, when the stadium hosted France's 2013 Rugby League World Cup game against New Zealand in front of a capacity crowd of 17,518.

Rugby league internationals
The France national team has played 15 test matches at the Parc des Sports (for a record of 3 wins, 11 losses and 1 draw) with the first held against Australia on 5 December 1982. The stadium also hosted a 2000 Rugby League World Cup qualifying match between Morocco and Lebanon in 1999.

References

External links

Venue information

Football venues in France
Rugby league stadiums in France
Rugby League World Cup stadiums
Rugby union stadiums in France
Athletics (track and field) venues in France
Multi-purpose stadiums in France
AC Arlésien
Buildings and structures in Avignon
Tourist attractions in Avignon
Sports venues in Vaucluse
Sports venues completed in 1975
AC Avignonnais